| website          = 
}}

Nita Strauss (born December 7, 1986) is an American rock musician. She is currently Demi Lovato's touring guitarist and was a former touring guitarist for Alice Cooper from 2014 to 2022 and has a successful career as a solo artist. Strauss was the first female signature artist with Ibanez guitars and is regularly featured on the covers of worldwide print magazines including Guitar World and Guitar Player. She was ranked No. 1 on Guitar Worlds list of "10 Female Guitar Players You Should Know".

Career 
Strauss started touring with her own band Lia-Fail as a teenager, leaving high school in her junior year to pursue music full time; the band included future world champion boxer Mikaela Mayer. Although initially known for her work with Iron Maiden all-female tribute band The Iron Maidens, Strauss' career has included performing with several rock ensembles including Consume the Fire, Femme Fatale, and the video-game supergroup Critical Hit.

In 2014, Strauss was the official in-house guitarist for the Los Angeles Kiss (LA KISS), the arena football team owned by Paul Stanley and Gene Simmons of KISS. The house band played the national anthem and provided additional music during the games.

In June 2014, Strauss was hired to replace Orianthi as Alice Cooper's touring guitarist for the remaining 2014 tour dates. She toured with Alice Cooper until July 2022, when she announced her departure from the touring band. A few days later, Strauss announced that she had joined Demi Lovato's backing band as a touring guitarist. On March 3rd, 2023, Alice Cooper announced that Strauss would return for the 2023 tour.

Strauss is featured as the main guitarist for seven songs on Docker's Guild album called The Heisenberg Diaries – Book A: Sounds of Future Past, released on January 21, 2016.

Strauss appeared in the 2017 Netflix documentary Hired Gun.

Solo artist

Controlled Chaos 
In April 2018, Strauss launched a Kickstarter campaign for her debut solo record Controlled Chaos. The campaign was successfully funded in two hours and eventually raised eight times its initial goal. Strauss produced the record herself, including the majority of the engineering work, and played all of the guitars and bass on the record.

After the record was completed, Strauss signed with Sumerian Records to release and distribute the album worldwide. The first single, "Our Most Desperate Hour", was released in September 2018 along with pre-orders for the record on both CD and vinyl, with the vinyl completely selling out before release. Controlled Chaos debuted on the Billboard charts at No. 1 Top New Artist, No. 3 Label Independent, No. 4 Top Hard Music, No. 8 Top Rock, No. 8 Top Internet, No. 20 Top albums, and No. 7 on the iTunes Rock chart. The album's second single, "Mariana Trench", was chosen by WWE as the official theme for NXT TakeOver: WarGames (2018).

WWE 
Strauss was introduced to World Wrestling Entertainment by her boyfriend Josh Villalta. She initially started watching because it was important to him, but quickly became a fan herself.

Strauss started performing live at WWE pay-per-view events in 2018. In April 2018, Strauss played Shinsuke Nakamura's entrance music at WrestleMania 34 in New Orleans in front of an audience of 78,000 fans and millions more who watched the worldwide streaming event. On October 28, Strauss performed with Lzzy Hale at WWE Evolution. Her original song "Mariana Trench" was chosen by Triple H as the official theme for NXT TakeOver: WarGames.

Special appearances 
Strauss performed the Star Spangled Banner at the 2017 Rock on the Range in Columbus, Ohio.

Strauss also performed the Star Spangled Banner for the 2022 WISE Power 400 at Auto Club Speedway.

Recognition 

In January 2018, Strauss became the first ever female Ibanez signature artist with her own model guitar, the Ibanez JIVA10. DiMarzio later released their Pandemonium humbuckers, signature pickups that were developed especially for her JIVA Ibanez guitar.

On January 26, 2019, Strauss was honored at the 7th Annual She Rocks Awards with the "Inspire Award", presented to her by Nick Bowcott and her personal hero, Steve Vai. 

On January 9, 2022, Strauss became the first female rock solo artist in 32 years to hit number one on Billboard's Mainstream Rock chart with her song "Dead Inside".

Teacher and mentor 
Strauss teaches guitar playing, and has gone on teaching tours offering master classes in the US, Canada, UK, Europe, South America, and Asia. She has written articles and recorded companion videos for Guitar World and Premier Guitar magazines.

Strauss and fellow musicians Rabea Massaad and Plini were selected as celebrity judges to choose the "2019 Young Guitarist of the Year" at the UK Guitar Show.

Personal life 
Strauss says she is a descendant of Austrian composer Johann Strauss through her father. Her sister, Varsha Strauss, is married to Panji Adhikumoro, grandson of Suharto, 2nd President of Indonesia from his son, Bambang Trihatmodjo.

Strauss is an avid fan of the Los Angeles Rams, she frequently appears at Rams games at Sofi Stadium, performing interludes or playing riffs out to the stadium to start crowd chants.
Strauss was honored to play "America the Beautiful" at the Rams' Salute to Service game in November 2018.

Health and fitness 
Strauss is a fitness enthusiast, practicing strength training, Muay Thai and Brazilian Jiu-Jitsu, and posts blogs about fitness issues on social media. She has been featured in Muscle & Fitness and Bodybuilding.com. In 2019, Strauss launched the Nita Strauss: Body Shred fitness challenge, with a companion e-book titled Body Shred: Your Guide to Feeling and Looking like a Rock Star.

Discography 

Strauss has recorded with Alice Cooper, Jamie Christopherson, Critical Hit, Docker's Guild, FB1964, Metal Allegiance, Kane Roberts and We Start Wars. She has been featured on albums by Maxxxwell Carlisle, Tina Guo and Angel Vivaldi, as well as the all-female compilation album She Rocks. She has played on dozens of albums, trailers and soundtracks, including Heroes of the Storm and Metal Gear Rising: Revengeance. Strauss released her first instrumental solo album, Controlled Chaos, on November 16, 2018.

Singles

Live band 
 Josh Villalta - drums
 Johnny Young - rhythm guitar
 Christopher Dean - bass
 Katt Scarlett - keyboards

Filmography

See also 
Femme Fatale
The Iron Maidens

References

External links 
 
 
 
 Critical Hit website
 Docker's Guild website
 
 
 
 

Living people
American heavy metal guitarists
American people of Austrian descent
21st-century American women guitarists
21st-century American guitarists
Alice Cooper (band) members
Nita Strauss
1986 births
Women in metal